The Amos Goodin House is a historic house at 37738 Wright Farm Road, in rural Loudoun County, Virginia northeast of Purcellville.  Once the center of a larger landholding, the house is a two-story stone farmhouse built about 1810, with a wooden porch extending across the front.  The layout of the house is a rare surviving example of an English "Mora Stuga" plan, with a hall that has a winding stair, and a single large chamber occupying most of the ground floor.

The property was listed on the National Register of Historic Places in 2017.

See also
National Register of Historic Places listings in Loudoun County, Virginia

References

Houses on the National Register of Historic Places in Virginia
Federal architecture in Virginia
Houses completed in 1810
Houses in Loudoun County, Virginia
National Register of Historic Places in Loudoun County, Virginia
Purcellville, Virginia